Veľký Lot used to be a part of Veľké Lovce, Slovakia. In 1899 the town was burnt down to the ground and after that it was connected to Malý Lót creating Lót.

Populated places in Slovakia